Great Grimsby is a constituency in North East Lincolnshire represented in the House of Commons of the Parliament of the United Kingdom since December 2019 by Lia Nici of the Conservative Party.

Constituency profile
Fishing is a significant sector in Grimsby which is a deprived area. These factors meant the constituency voted strongly to leave the EU in 2016.

Current boundaries

The present constituency follows the boundaries of the old Borough of Great Grimsby, which was abolished when the former county of Humberside was divided into four unitary authorities in 1996. From the 2010 general election new boundaries took effect, but the Boundary Commission's review led only to minimal changes, aligning the constituency boundaries with present ward boundaries so the seat still has electoral wards:
East Marsh, Freshney, Heneage, Park, Scartho, South, West Marsh and Yarborough.

History
The constituency has been represented since the first House of Commons was assembled in the Model Parliament of 1295, and it elected two MPs until 1832. Great Grimsby was established as a parliamentary borough in 1295, sending two burgesses, and has been continuously represented ever since. The town of Grimsby in Lincolnshire, a market town, fishing port and seaport.

Freemen of the town had the right to vote, provided they were resident and paying scot and lot; in 1831 this amounted to just under 400 voters. The town corporation bestowed this status, as today, rarely on those bringing acclaim to the place, but it was routinely acquired through apprenticeship in the guilds and by inheritance; in Great Grimsby, unusually, the husband of a freeman's daughter or widow acquired the freedom.

In 1831, when the Reform Bill was being discussed in Parliament, the wives and daughters of the Great Grimsby freemen petitioned the House of Lords to retain their rights to pass on the vote to their future husbands and children.  However, their concern to retain these rights may not have been rooted in any their family desiring to help choose the borough's MPs as a vote in Great Grimsby was a valuable commodity in a more mercenary sense, and the contemporary polemicist Oldfield considered that "This borough stands second to none in the history of corruption." At the start of the 18th century it was noted that Grimsby's "freemen did enter into treaties with several gentlemen in London, for sale of the choice of burgess to such as would give the most money". In 1701, the House of Commons overturned the election of one of Great Grimsby's MPs, William Cotesworth, for bribery and sent him to the Tower of London and temporarily suspended the borough's right to representation. Almost every election in Great Grimsby at this period was followed by a petition from defeated candidates alleging bribery, although that of 1701 seems to have been the only one which was acted upon.

Great Grimsby, like most boroughs except for the very largest, recognised a "patron" who could generally exercise influence over the choice of its MPs; at the time of the Great Reform Act of 1832, this was Lord Yarborough. However, the extent of the patron's power was limited in Great Grimsby, and the voters were quite prepared (at a price) to defy his advice. The patron could strengthen his position by providing employment to the freemen, as could his rivals. Jupp quotes two letters, one of 1818 and one of 1819, in which local agents advise the Tennyson family how best to do this in Grimsby so as to encroach on Lord Yarborough's influence:
"Build upon every spot of vacant ground you are possessed of... Thus you would give employment to a great number of freemen... Let Mr Heneage's estates be divided into fields of four or six acres; and let these, together with your own estates be placed in the hands of freemen to whom they would be an object of importance. Provide, if possible, small farms for the sons of Lord Yarbro's tenants".
On a less extravagant level, it is recorded that after Charles Tennyson was first elected in 1818 he presented a bottle of wine to each of the fathers of 92 local children about to be christened.

The General Election of 1831 in Grimsby was as notorious as in some of the rotten boroughs, the local Tories being accused of using a revenue cutter lying in the Humber to ply the Whig voters with drink and prevent them getting to the polls; the fact of the outcome standing led to a nationally well-known action by John Shelley for libel.

In 1831, the population of the borough was 4,008, and contained 784 houses. The Boundary Act in concert with the Reform Act enlarged the borough to include eight neighbouring parishes, brought the population up to 6,413 with 1,365 houses but the landed property aspect to the franchise was not reformed so this increased the electorate only to 656 so Great Grimsby lost one of its two seats.  However, Grimsby's population and housing continued to grow and, unlike most of the boroughs that lost one seat in 1832, it has retained its existence, without taking up large swathes of the county.

The constituency underwent further significant boundary change in 1918 and 1950. In 1918, parishes that had joined, (Bradley, Great Coates, Little Coates, Laceby, Waltham, Weelsby and the adjoining neighbourhood/parish of Scartho) were detached to be added to Louth county constituency, and the seat  consisted of the county borough of Grimsby and the urban district (later borough) of Cleethorpes. In 1950, Cleethorpes was moved into the Louth county division, leaving the borough once more as Grimsby alone. More recent boundary changes have only been adjustments to conform to changes at local government level.

Labour's Austin Mitchell retained the seat in 1977 by only 520 votes in a by-election following the death of the Foreign Secretary Tony Crosland. He held the seat until retiring in 2015. At the 2010 election, Mitchell's majority was again reduced to three figures, after a swing of over 10% to the Conservatives.

At the 2015 election, Great Grimsby was considered a target for the United Kingdom Independence Party (UKIP). UKIP had selected as their candidate the 2010 Conservative candidate, Victoria Ayling, who had switched parties since the previous election. Labour's candidate was Melanie Onn, while the Conservatives stood Marc Jones. In the event however, Onn was successful, increasing Mitchell's majority of 714 more than sixfold and enjoying a swing of 5.6% from the Conservatives, with UKIP finishing third, just 57 votes behind the Conservatives. The Conservative and UKIP votes combined outnumbered the Labour vote, which was an indication that the Labour position was potentially precarious.

Similarly to many other traditionally working class Labour strongholds – labelled the "Red Wall" – in the North of England, in 2019, Great Grimsby was won by the Conservatives for the first time since 1935.

Members of Parliament

MPs 1295–1660

MPs 1660–1832

MPs since 1832

Elections

Elections in the 2010s

Elections in the 2000s

Elections in the 1990s

Elections in the 1980s

Elections in the 1970s

Elections in the 1960s

Elections in the 1950s

Elections in the 1940s

Elections in the 1930s

Elections in the 1920s

Elections in the 1910s

|colspan="6"|Due to the outbreak of the First World War, this election did not take place. These candidates were chosen by Autumn 1914.

Elections in the 1900s

Elections in the 1890s

 Doughty resigned to seek re-election as a candidate for the Liberal Unionist Party.

 Caused by Josse's resignation.

Elections in the 1880s

 Caused by Heneage's appointment as Chancellor of the Duchy of Lancaster.

Elections in the 1870s

 Caused by Chapman's death.

Elections in the 1860s

 Caused by Anderson-Pelham's succession to the peerage, becoming Earl of Yarborough.

Elections in the 1850s

Elections in the 1840s

Elections in the 1830s

 Caused by the 1831 election being overturned on petition.

See also
 List of parliamentary constituencies in Humberside

Notes

References

Sources
 Robert Beatson, A Chronological Register of Both Houses of Parliament (London: Longman, Hurst, Res & Orme, 1807) A Chronological Register of Both Houses of the British Parliament, from the Union in 1708, to the Third Parliament of the United Kingdom of Great Britain and Ireland, in 1807
Cobbett's Parliamentary history of England, from the Norman Conquest in 1066 to the year 1803 (London: Thomas Hansard, 1808) titles A-Z
 F W S Craig, British Parliamentary Election Results 1832-1885 (2nd edition, Aldershot: Parliamentary Research Services, 1989)
 Peter Jupp, British and Irish Elections 1784-1831 (Newton Abbott: David & Charles, 1973)
 T. H. B. Oldfield, The Representative History of Great Britain and Ireland (London: Baldwin, Cradock & Joy, 1816)
 Edward Porritt and Annie G Porritt, The Unreformed House of Commons (Cambridge University Press, 1903)
 J Holladay Philbin, Parliamentary Representation 1832 - England and Wales (New Haven: Yale University Press, 1965)
 Robert Walcott, English Politics in the Early Eighteenth Century (Oxford: Oxford University Press, 1956)
 Frederic A Youngs, jr, Guide to the Local Administrative Units of England, Vol II (London: Royal Historical Society, 1991)

Parliamentary constituencies in Yorkshire and the Humber
Constituencies of the Parliament of the United Kingdom established in 1295
Politics of Grimsby